Ellicombe is a surname. Notable people with the surname include:

Charles Grene Ellicombe (1783–1871), English general and royal engineer
Henry Thomas Ellicombe (1790–1885), English divine and antiquary, brother of Charles

See also
Ellacombe (disambiguation)